There is a community of Australians in India, consisting mostly of expatriates and migrants from Australia, as well as some Australian OCIs. Australia has a High Commission in New Delhi and Consulates in Mumbai and Chennai.

Overview
According to the Australian High Commission, there are about 3,000 to 4,000 Australians living and working in India. Industries such as hospitality, financial services and mining and materials have relatively higher concentration of Australian expatriates. About 1,000 Australian companies evince interest in doing projects in India every year despite the challenges of "bureaucracy" and "delays" as opportunities outnumber these impediments.  At present, there are about 60 Australian companies working in the infrastructure sector in India. Large Australian firms such as BHP, Rio Tinto, SMEC Holdings, Macquarie Group and CIMIC Group have operations in India.

There are also many Australian cricketers wanting to get into Indian Premier League.

In popular culture
 Shantaram - a 2003 novel by Gregory David Roberts based on Roberts' own experiences in Mumbai

Notable people
 Anne Warner - Australian state politician (born in India)
 Bob Christo - Indian actor
 King Kong - Professional wrestler & actor
 Fearless Nadia - Indian film actress & stunt-woman
 Graham Staines - Australian missionary & physician
 Gregory David Roberts - Australian author, former addict & convicted bank robber
 Isha Sharvani - Indian actress & dancer
 Pallavi Sharda - Film/Theatre actress and dancer
 Peter Varghese - High Commissioner of Australia to India from 2009-2012, migrated from India to Australia in childhood
 Emma Brown Garrett - Australian actress

Business and social associations 
There are a number of business and social organizations for Australian's in India including:

 Australian and New Zealand Business Association (ANZBAI), Mumbai
 Australian, New Zealand Association (ANZA), Delhi
 Indo-Australian Chamber of Commerce (IACC), Chennai

See also

 Australia–India relations
 Indian Australians
 Australians in the United Kingdom

References

India
 
Australia–India relations
Australia